The Focke-Wulf A 38 Möwe (German: "Gull") was an airliner, produced in Germany in the early 1930s. It was a final development of the family of designs that commenced with the A 17 in 1927. The A 38 used the same high-mounted, cantilever wing as the A 29, but mated this to an all-new fuselage design with enclosed seating for ten passengers and three crew. Unlike earlier members of the family, the flight deck was not joined to the cabin, separated now by a lavatory and baggage compartment. The main undercarriage was strengthened and the mainwheels fitted with brakes, while the tailskid was replaced with a tailwheel. All four A 38s were originally fitted with Siemens- or Gnome et Rhône-built Bristol Jupiter engines (although the BMW VI had been offered as an option), but in April 1933, all aircraft were refitted with Siemens Sh 20 powerplants. By mid-1934, they had been relegated to training duties.

Specifications

References

 
 
 
 German aircraft between 1919-1945

1930s German airliners
A 38
Single-engined tractor aircraft
High-wing aircraft
Aircraft first flown in 1931